is a railway station on the Iida Line in Iida,  Nagano Prefecture, Japan, operated by Central Japan Railway Company (JR Central).

Lines
Ina-Kamisato Station is served by the Iida Line and is 131.1 kilometers from the starting point of the line at Toyohashi Station.

Station layout
The station consists of a single ground-level side platform serving one bi-directional track. There is no station building, but only a platform built on top of the platform. The station is unattended.

Adjacent stations

History
It became  on 16 January 1935, and was renamed Ina-Kamisato in January 1936. With the privatization of Japanese National Railways (JNR) on 1 April 1987, the station came under the control of JR Central.

Passenger statistics
In fiscal 2016, the station was used by an average of 698 passengers daily (boarding passengers only).

Surrounding area
Kuroda Puppet Theatre
Iida High School

See also
 List of railway stations in Japan

References

External links

 Ina-Kamisato Station information 

Railway stations in Nagano Prefecture
Railway stations in Japan opened in 1935
Stations of Central Japan Railway Company
Iida Line
Iida, Nagano